Massachusetts gained three seats after the 1810 Census, all of which were added to the District of Maine.

See also 
 Massachusetts's 17th congressional district special election, 1812
 United States House of Representatives elections, 1812 and 1813
 List of United States representatives from Massachusetts

1812
United States House of Representatives
Massachusetts
United States House of Representatives
Massachusetts